Greg Uttsada Panichkul (born September 3, 1973) is an American-born Thai actor, television presenter and model. He was a VJ for MTV Asia for over 15 years, making him one of Asia's longest running hosts and cementing his star status. Most recently Panichkul was the Director of Entertainment at IN Channel in Thailand and also a directorship at Beam Artistes in Singapore

Early life
Panichkul was born and raised in California in a Thai Chinese household. His father was a professor in social science. Panichkul studied at California State University, Northridge majoring in Biology and transferred to Assumption University majoring in Communication Arts. While at Assumption, he did some modeling on the side, although, initially to earn enough for a plane ticket back to California.

Career
Fluent in both English and Thai, Panichkul acted in several Thai television series while in Thailand, one of his notable roles very early on was in Song Klam Doag Rak (1997), where he acted as an HIV-positive sex worker. Panichkul received a nomination for Best Actor at the Thailand Television Awards. 

Panichkul was previously the spokesperson for the Giordano, Pepsi and Brand's Essence of Chicken. He is the Director of Beam Artistes Singapore and also the owner and director of his own Singapore-based Artiste Management company, Seven95ive Artistes.

Together with former model Thúy Hạnh, Panichkul is a permanent judge of MTV VJ Hunt for MTV Vietnam. He is also one of the regular guest judges on Supermodel Me.
In Linkin Park's Burning In The Skies music video, Panichkul got a small role as the guy who broke a sweat and jumped out from fire.

Filmography

Television

Shows

References

External links
 Official Website
 VJ Utt at MTV Asia
 Seven95ive Artistes
 Profile on xinmnsn

1973 births
Utt Panichkul
Utt Panichkul
VJs (media personalities)
Living people
Utt Panichkul
Male models from California
Utt Panichkul
Utt Panichkul